Doris Jean Hanson (October 24, 1925 – November 8, 2006) was an American realtor, politician, and public administrator.  She was the 7th secretary of the Wisconsin Department of Administration, and the first woman to hold that office.  Later she was a member of the Wisconsin State Assembly, representing the east side of the city of Madison and central Dane County.

Biography

Born in Madison, Wisconsin, Hanson went to University of Wisconsin–Madison. Governor Tony Earl appointed Hanson the first woman to be secretary of the Wisconsin Department of Administration. Hanson served as president of the village of McFarland, Wisconsin, from 1991 to 1995, and she was on the village board. Hanson served in the Wisconsin State Assembly from 1992 to 1998. After her retirement, Hanson served as director of TEACH Wisconsin.

References

External links

Politicians from Madison, Wisconsin
University of Wisconsin–Madison alumni
Mayors of places in Wisconsin
Wisconsin city council members
Members of the Wisconsin State Assembly
Women state legislators in Wisconsin
State cabinet secretaries of Wisconsin
1925 births
2006 deaths
20th-century American politicians
Women city councillors in Wisconsin
20th-century American women politicians
People from McFarland, Wisconsin
21st-century American women